is a Japanese manga series by Kei Kusunoki which was originally serialized in Shogakukan's Shōnen Sunday Zōkan from March 1986 to May 1990. The manga was later adapted into a three–episode original video animation (OVA) in 1990, and an eleven–episode television drama.

Plot
The story follows Yūji Yagami, a high school student with a problem: his mother, Nomi, looks very young and Yūji has a crush on her. To complicate matters, his high school homeroom teacher is also infatuated with her due to how young she looks. Nomi is oblivious to all of this and is head over heels in love with her husband, Yōji, and frequently displays this affection very publicly, which causes more embarrassment for Yūji.

Yūji's high school friends constantly tease him about his "mother complex". When Valentine's Day comes around, though, Yūji receives a box of handmade chocolates. The name on card can be read multiple ways, the most common way being , a male name, so his friends tease him throughout the day until it is time to meet the person who sent the chocolates at the front gate after school.

The girl who sent the chocolates (the name is actually read "Mayuki")  starts meeting him after school so they can walk home together, and they eventually become an item. The remainder of the story follows Yūji and Mayuki as their love grows and as Yūji works to resolve his "mother complex" issues.

Characters

Main characters

Yūji has a "mother complex" because his mother appears to be very young and he finds her attractive. This is used throughout the series for comedic effect. He feels guilty about how he feels about his mother.

Yūji's mother. She is a bit naive and has a tendency to dote on her only son.

Yūji's girlfriend. Due to the characters used to write her given name (which can be read "Masayuki", a male name), the love note she sent to announce her feelings was interpreted as being from a boy, much to Yūji's chagrin and his friends' amusement. She is shy and indecisive, so it took her a long time to work up the courage to let Yūji know about her feelings. However, she has a temper and frequently gets upset at Yūji for his indecisiveness. She drives a bullet bike.

Yūji's homeroom teacher. He fell in love with Nomi at first sight, and is constantly flirting with her. Nomi is the only one who does not seem to notice his flirting, though.

Yūji's father, a salaryman. He has a very close, romantic relationship with Nomi, which often embarrasses Yūji.

A 23-year-old office lady. She secretly wishes to have an affair with her boss, Yōji, and is very jealous. She is constantly flirting with him.

Nomi's student. He acts as the comic foil to Nomi's unwitting naive mistakes.

Other characters

One of Yūji's friend's from his homeroom at high school.

One of Yūji's friend's from his homeroom at high school.

One of Yūji's friend's from his homeroom at high school.

Media

Manga
Yagami-kun's Family Affairs, written and illustrated by Kei Kusunoki, was serialized in Shogakukan's Shōnen Sunday Zōkan from the March 1986 to the May 1990 issues. Shogakukan collected its chapters in seven tankōbon volumes, released from  August 18, 1987, to August 18, 1990.

Volume list

Original video animation
A three–episode original video animation (OVA) adaptation by Kitty Film Mitaka Studio was released in Japan on May 25, 1990.

Drama
An eleven–episode Japanese television drama was broadcast on TV Asahi from October 11, 1994, to February 2, 1995.

References

External links
 

1986 manga
1990 anime OVAs
Japanese drama television series
Romantic comedy anime and manga
Shōnen manga
Shogakukan manga
TV Asahi original programming